Terence Walter Harris (16 July 1923 – 21 November 1980) was a New Zealand water polo player who represented his country at the 1950 British Empire Games.

At the 1950 British Empire Games he won the silver medal as part of the men's water polo team.

References

1923 births
1980 deaths
Commonwealth Games silver medallists for New Zealand
New Zealand male water polo players
Water polo players at the 1950 British Empire Games
Commonwealth Games competitors for New Zealand